Kileh Sefid (also Romanized as Kīleh Sefīd and Keyleh Sefīd; also known as Greylā Harmān, Kal-i-Sefīd, Kelāiarman, and Kelājarmān) is a village in Hoseynabad-e Shomali Rural District, Saral District, Divandarreh County, Kurdistan Province, Iran. At the 2006 census, its population was 133, in 31 families. The village is populated by Kurds.

References 

Towns and villages in Divandarreh County
Kurdish settlements in Kurdistan Province